Wilferd Ferdinand Madelung FBA (b. December 26, 1930 in Stuttgart) is a German-British author and scholar of Islamic history.

Life 
After World War II, the adolescent Wilferd accompanied his parents to the USA where his father Georg Hans Madelung continued his career as an aeronautic engineer specialized on rockets. Wilferd Madelung enrolled at Georgetown University in Washington DC before going to Cairo in 1951 to study Arabic literature and Islamic history. From 1958 to 1960 he served as Cultural attaché at the West German Embassy in Baghdad, before starting his scientific career.

Academic career 

Madelung received his doctorate and habilitation at the University of Hamburg in Germany (lecturer for Islamic studies 1963‒1966). His PhD thesis was about "The Qarmatians and the Fatimids. Their mutual relations and their teachings on the Imamate." He was Visiting Professor at the University of Texas at Austin in 1963; then he was Assistant Professor (1964–65), Associate Professor (1966–68) and then Professor of Islamic History from 1969 until 1978 at the University of Chicago. He was Laudian Professor of Arabic at the University of Oxford from 1978 to 1998.

Wilferd Madelung has written academic journal articles and lectures about Ibadism. He is a member of the British Academy since 1999 and currently a senior research fellow at the Institute for Ismaili Studies in London.

In 2013 he was awarded the Farabi International Award by the Iranian Ministry of Islamic Guidance and Culture for his significant contributions to the fields of Islamic and Iranian studies.

Works

 Madelung, W. (editor) - Arabic Texts Concerning The History of The Zaydī Imāms of Tabaristān, Daylamān And Gīlān, collected and edited by Wilferd Madelung. Franz Steiner Verlag, Beirut and Wiesbaden, 1987.
 Madelung, W. - Religious Trends in Early Islamic Iran. Columbia Letters of Iranian Studies no. 4, The Persian Heritage Foundation, 1988. ISBN 0-88706-700-X / 0-88706-701-8 (pbk.).
 Madelung, W. - Religious and Ethnic Movements in Medieval Islam, Ashgate Publishing, 1992. (New editions from 2016 on by Routledge, Oxon and New York, ISBN 978-086078-310-7
 Madelung, W. - The Succession to Muhammad, Cambridge University Press, 1997, ISBN 0521646960. 
 Madelung, W. and Walker, P. - An Ismaili Heresiography: The 'Bāb al-Shayṭān' from Abū Tammāms' Kitāb al-shajara, Leiden, 1998.
 Madelung, W. and Walker, P. - The Advent of the Fatimids: A Contemporary Shi'i Witness. An Edition and English Translation of Ibn al-Haytham’s Kitab al-Munazarat, by Wilferd Madelung and Paul E. Walker. I.B. Tauris, London, 2000, ISBN 1-86064-551-8. (Published online by Cambridge University Press in 2016.)
 Madelung, W. - Der Imam al-Qasim ibn Ibrahim und die Glaubenslehre der Zaiditen, Walter De Gruyter Incorporated, 2002 (first edition 1966), ISBN 9783110826548.
 Aḥmad b. Yaḥyā al-Balāḏurī: Ansāb al-Ašrāf (Part 2). Edited by Wilferd Madelung. Beirut, 2003. 
 Muhammad Ibn Umail: Book of the Explanation of the Symbols. Kitāb Ḥall ar-Rumūz (Corpus Alchemicum Arabicum. Vol. I). Edited by Theodor Abt, Wilferd Madelung, Thomas Hofmeier, with Introduction by Theodor Abt. Living Human Heritage Publications, Zurich, 2003; ISBN 3-9522608-1-9.
 Madelung, W. - Religious school and sects in medieval Islam, Variorum Reprints, 1985.
 Madelung, W. (editor) - The Book of the Rank of the Sage. Rutbat al-Ḥakīm by Maslama al-Qurṭubī. Arabic Text edited with an English Introduction by Wilferd Madelung. Corpus Alchemicum Arabicum IV. Living Human Heritage Publications, Zurich 2016.
 Muhammad Ibn Umail: The Pure Pearl and other texts by Muhammad Ibn Umail. Ad-Durra an-naqīya, As-Sīra an-naqīya, Al-Qașīda al-Mīmīya, Al-Mabāqil as-sab'a (Corpus Alchemicum Arabicum. Vol. V). Arabic Edition by Wilferd Madelung with an Introduction by Theodor Abt. Translation by Salwa Fuad and Theodor Abt. Living Human Heritage Publications, Zurich, 2019; ISBN 978-3-9524468-3-6.

See also
List of Islamic scholars

References

External links
Institute for Ismaili Studies - Culture and Memory in Early and Medieval Islam: A Festschrift in honour of Wilferd Madelung, ed. F. Daftary and J. Meri. London: I.B. Taurus, 2003.

1930 births
Living people
German Islamic studies scholars
German Arabists
Laudian Professors of Arabic
Fellows of St John's College, Oxford
Ismailism
Ibadi Islam
Ibadi studies
Academic staff of the University of Hamburg